Wanlambok Nongkhlaw (born 9 February 1993) is an Indian cricketer. He made his List A debut for Meghalaya in the 2018–19 Vijay Hazare Trophy on 4 October 2018. He made his first-class debut for Meghalaya in the 2018–19 Ranji Trophy on 6 December 2018. He made his Twenty20 debut for Meghalaya in the 2018–19 Syed Mushtaq Ali Trophy on 21 February 2019.

Outside of cricket, Nongkhlaw works for the traffic police.

References

External links
 

1993 births
Living people
Indian cricketers
Meghalaya cricketers
Place of birth missing (living people)